Lloyd Madsen (born 13 June 1986, Durban, South Africa) is a South African field hockey player. At the 2012 Summer Olympics, he competed for the national team in the tournament. His brother Wayne has also played field hockey for South Africa, and now plays county cricket in England.

References

External links

Living people
South African male field hockey players
Field hockey players at the 2012 Summer Olympics
Olympic field hockey players of South Africa
1986 births
Sportspeople from Durban
Alumni of Kearsney College
2010 Men's Hockey World Cup players
2014 Men's Hockey World Cup players